The 2023 NZWIHL season is the ninth season of the New Zealand Women's Ice Hockey League (NZWIHL). It ran from 12 August 2022 until 25 September 2022. Four teams competed in 12 regular season games followed by 4 playoff games, making up the NZWIHL Finals weekend. The Wakatipu Wild claimed the double by winning both the premiership title for finishing top of the regular season standings and the championship title by winning the grand final. Canterbury Inferno finished runner-up to both titles and the Dunedin Thunder claimed the wooden spoon.

Teams

In 2022 the NZWIHL had four teams, consisting of one from the North Island and three from the South Island.

League Business

The league was on the agenda at the New Zealand Ice Hockey Federation (NZIHF) annual general meeting (AGM) in February and November 2022. The NZIHF confirmed they had underwritten team travel expenses in 2022 in order to ensure the 2022 season could be played, given the disruption and early end to the 2021 season. The league had been focusing on improving social media delivery for 2022. The updated league events manual was released in July 2022, ahead of the season commencing.

Regular season
Running between 12 August 2022 until 18 September 2022, the NZWIHL regular season consisted of 12 games in total, with each team playing six games.

Fixtures & results

Key:

Standings

Player stats
The season's league leader statistics for skaters and goaltenders.

Season awards

Below lists the 2022 NZWIHL season award winners.

NZWIHL playoffs
The top four teams in the NZWIHL regular season qualify for the NZWIHL playoffs. The playoffs is held on a single weekend and uses New Zealand conventions of being called Finals. The playoff system used by the NZWIHL is a four team single game semi-finals and grand final system where the semi-final winners progress to the grand final and the losers playoff for third place. Semi-finals are played on the Saturday and the third place playoff and grand final is played on the Sunday. Th winner of the grand final is awarded a trophy and the top three teams are awarded gold, silver and bronze medals at the conclusion of the grand final. The NZWIHL also uses this time to announce team and league season awards.

In 2022, all four teams in the league qualified for the finals weekend. The event was held on the weekend of 24 and 25 September 2022 in host city Dunedin at Dunedin Ice Stadium. On day one, first placed Wakatipu Wild played fourth placed Dunedin Thunder in the first semi-final game and won comfortably. Second placed Canterbury Inferno ensured the top two seeds progressed to the grand final with a five goals to two victory over the Auckland Steel in semi-final two. On Day two of the Finals weekend, Auckland played hosts Dunedin for the bronze medal. Both teams made a number of changes including goaltenders and it was the Steel who defeated the Thunder and claimed bronze. In the grand final, the Wild successfully shutout the Inferno to claim their first ever NZWIHL championship title in their second full season since their formation in 2020.

Semi-finals

Third place playoff

Final

References

External links 
New Zealand Women's Hockey League
New Zealand Ice Hockey Federation
 Elite Prospects league profile

NZL
ice hockey